Sultana Bulbul is a Bangladesh Awami League politician and the former Member of Bangladesh Parliament from a reserved seat.

Early life
Bulbul was born on 15 January 1950 and has studied up to S.S.C. or grade ten.

Career
Bulbul was elected to parliament from reserved seat as a Bangladesh Awami League candidate in 2009.

References

Awami League politicians
Living people
1950 births
Women members of the Jatiya Sangsad
9th Jatiya Sangsad members
21st-century Bangladeshi women politicians
21st-century Bangladeshi politicians